Alxa Left Banner (Mongolian:    Alaša Jegün qosiɣu, Cyrillic: Алшаа зүүн хошуу) is a banner (administrative division) in the southwest of Inner Mongolia, China. It borders the Republic of Mongolia's Ömnögovi Province to the north, the autonomous region of Ningxia to the southeast, and Gansu province to the southwest. The town of Bayanhot/Bayenhot (Tingyuanying), situated in the banner, is the seat of government of the greater Alxa League, of which Alxa Left Banner is a part.

Alxa Left Banner is on the route of provincial highway S218, which is accessible via China National Highway 110 via the city of Wuhai. It is also accessible by air via the Alxa Left Banner Bayanhot Airport.

Ethnic Mongols make up 27% of the banner population.

The average elevation is between 800 and 1500 meters above sea level. A large part of the banner is desert.

The banner is subdivided into four subdistricts, 8 towns, and 6 sums and one Economic and Technological Development Zone.

Climate

References

www.xzqh.org 

Banners of Inner Mongolia
Alxa League